Snoop Dogg's Father Hood is an American reality television series, executive produced and directed by David Roma, as well as Ted Chung, Constance Schwartz and Anthony Mandler.  The series debuted on December 9, 2007 in the United States on E!, with the second and final season premiering on November 30, 2008.

Premise
The series follows the daily life of rapper Snoop Dogg and his family. His family includes his wife Shante, daughter Cori whom he calls "Choc", son Cordell whom he calls "Rook", and his oldest son Corde whom he calls "Spank".

Series Overview

Episodes

Season 1

Season 2

References

External links
 

2000s American reality television series
2007 American television series debuts
2009 American television series endings
English-language television shows
E! original programming
African-American reality television series
Television series based on singers and musicians
Television shows set in the United States